Melnick 34 (abbreviated to Mk34), also called BAT99-116, is a binary Wolf–Rayet star near R136 in the 30 Doradus complex (also known as the Tarantula Nebula) in the Large Magellanic Cloud.  Both components are amongst the most massive and most luminous stars known, and the system is the most massive known binary system.

Binary

Melnick 34 is a binary star with an orbital period of 155 days.  It shows high x-ray luminosity characteristic of colliding-wind binaries, and periodic variations in luminosity, spectral absorption, and the x-ray brightness.

The orbit has been calculated based on spectroscopic observations with the Very Large Telescope. The similar orbital speeds show that the two components have similar masses; the secondary has amass 92% of the primary, assuming an inclination near . The inclination of  best matches the orbital properties of the two stars to their observed properties.

Physical characteristics

The two components of Mk34 have identical spectral classes of WN5h, having spectra with prominent emission lines of highly-ionised helium, nitrogen, and carbon.  The h suffix indicates that the spectrum also contains lines of hydrogen which are not usually seen in Wolf-Rayet spectra.  The strength of the helium emission lines in the spectrum shows that the outer layers of the star consist of 35% helium.

The WN5 spectral class indicates an extremely high photospheric temperature.

The masses determined from the orbit of the stars depends strongly on the inclination of the orbit, which is poorly known. The best match with the observed masses is found for orbits with an inclination near .

The emission line spectra of the two stars in the Mk34 system are caused by strong mass loss which produces a dense stellar wind.  Both stars have a stellar wind with a velocity of about  causing each star to lose more than the mass of the sun every , a billion times stronger than the sun's wind.

Evolution
Although Wolf-Rayet stars are typically old stars that have lost their outer layers of hydrogen, some are very young massive stars which still contain hydrogen. Both stars in the Mk34 system are very young, and the helium, carbon, and nitrogen fusion products in their spectra are produced by the strong convection that occurs in massive main sequence stars and by rotational mixing.

These are similar to the masses deduced from observation. The stars are expected to have a hydrogen-burning lifetime of about 2.2 Myr, and are not expected to experience significant mass exchange during their evolution. Both stars should reach core collapse with masses too high to produce a normal supernova. Instead they are likely to produce a weak supernova followed by collapse to a black hole, or directly collapse to a black hole with no visible explosion.

References

Further reading

External links
ESA/Hubble image

Stars in the Large Magellanic Cloud
Dorado (constellation)
Large Magellanic Cloud
Tarantula Nebula
Extragalactic stars
Wolf–Rayet stars
J05384424-6906058
Spectroscopic binaries